Michel Vaillant Mbiobe Mouegni (3 February 1996) is a Cameroonian footballer, who plays as a forward.

Club career
Born in Yaoundé, Vaillant joined Napredak Kruševac in summer 2015. He used to play for AS Green City. For the season 2014–15, he was with the first team, but also played for Napredak's youth team. After the end of his youth career, he was with Napredak's reserves and was once time in protocol for the Serbian First League. Later, the player was loaned to Mladost Lučani.

After he did not get a real chance for playing at Napredak, Vaillant moved to Mladost Lučani in September 2015. He made his Serbian SuperLiga debut on 19 September 2015 in the 10th fixture of the 2015–16 season against Voždovac, under coach Nenad Milovanović. After a season playing with Mladost Lučani as a loaned player, he signed a one-year contract with the club.

In summer 2018, Vaillant returned to Kruševac and joined newly promoted Serbian First League side Trayal, on six-month loan deal. He made his debut for the club on 29 August 2018, replacing Uroš Vesić in 1–1 draw to Zlatibor Čajetina.

International career
In October 2016, Vaillant received a call for the Cameroon national under-23 football team for a game played on October 6 against Morocco U23.

In August 2017, Vaillant was part of the Cameroon U23 team playing at the 2017 Islamic Solidarity Games held in Baku, Azerbaijan. There he played along his older brother, Macky Bagnack who is a defender.

Career statistics

Club

References

External links
 Michel Vaillant stats at utakmica.rs 
 
 

1996 births
Living people
Footballers from Yaoundé
Association football forwards
Cameroonian footballers
FK Napredak Kruševac players
FK Mladost Lučani players
FK Trayal Kruševac players
KF Bylis Ballsh players
FK Budućnost Dobanovci players
Serbian First League players
Serbian SuperLiga players
Kategoria Superiore players
Cameroonian expatriate footballers
Expatriate footballers in Serbia
Cameroonian expatriate sportspeople in Serbia
Expatriate footballers in Albania
Cameroonian expatriate sportspeople in Albania